John Murray Mordaunt  (30 December 1837 — 21 December 1923) was an English first-class cricketer, British Army officer and shipbuilder.

The son of Sir John Mordaunt, he was born at Stratford-upon-Avon in December 1837. He was educated at Eton College, where he played in the cricket eleven. From Eton he went up to Christ Church College at the Oxford, though he did not feature for the Oxford University Cricket Club during his studies there. Six years after he had graduated from Oxford, Mordaunt was commissioned as a cornet in the Warwickshire Yeomanry in September 1861 and in December 1862, he was appointed deputy lieutenant for Warwickshire. Mordaunt made two appearances in first-class cricket in 1863, playing for the Marylebone Cricket Club against Oxford University at Lord's and for the Gentlemen of Marylebone Cricket Club against the Gentlemen of Kent at Canterbury during the Canterbury Cricket Week, scoring a total of 35 runs across both matches. 

In April 1864, he was promoted to lieutenant in the Warwickshire Yeomanry. Mordaunt went into business with Thomas Ridley Oswald as a shipbuilder in Southampton in 1878, with the company being declared bankrupt in 1881. In addition to having served as a deputy lieutenant for Warwickshire, Mordaunt was also a justice of the peace for the county. He died at Westminster in December 1923. He was married to Elizabeth Evelyn Cotes, with the couple having five children; their three sons Eustace, Gerald and Henry all played first-class cricket. Other relations who also played first-class cricket included his brother, Osbert, great-grandson David Mordaunt and nephew Francis Portman.

References

External links

1837 births
1923 deaths
People from Stratford-upon-Avon
Younger sons of baronets
People educated at Eton College
Alumni of Christ Church, Oxford
Warwickshire Yeomanry officers
English cricketers
Marylebone Cricket Club cricketers
Gentlemen of Marylebone Cricket Club cricketers
Deputy Lieutenants of Warwickshire
English justices of the peace
English shipbuilders